Live at the It Club is a Thelonious Monk album released posthumously by Columbia Records. Recorded October 31 and November 1, 1964, at the "It" Club in Los Angeles, California, the album features Monk's quartet—with Charlie Rouse on tenor saxophone, Larry Gales on bass, and Ben Riley on drums—performing original compositions as well as jazz standards.

The album was first issued in 1982 as a double-LP entitled Live At The "It" Club. In 1998, Columbia/Legacy Records reissued the album as a double-CD set entitled Live At The It Club--Complete that includes virtually all of the band's performances from the two evenings.

History
In 1964 Monk assembled and began touring and recording with what would come to be regarded as his "most venerable" quartet. On October 31 and November 2 Monk recorded sessions for the album Solo Monk. The band performed on October 31 and November 1 at the It Club, and then again on November 3 and 4 at San Francisco's Jazz Workshop, performances that were later released as Live at the Jazz Workshop. Critic Bob Blumenthal called Live at the It Club "an incredible cache of vintage Monk" that serves as "a prime document of what [Monk's] band sounded like" during this productive period.

Track listing
The quartet played three short sets on each of their two nights at the It Club. Tracks were omitted or edited for the 1982 release. The 1998 "complete" reissue includes the music as it was played, with a few exceptions. A take of "Sweet and Lovely" was omitted due to issues with recording quality, and "Straight, No Chaser", originally performed after "Bemsha Swing," was placed on the second disc.

1982 Original LP

1998 CD Reissue

Personnel
Thelonious Monk – piano
Charlie Rouse – tenor sax
Larry Gales – bass
Ben Riley – drums

References

Albums produced by Teo Macero
Thelonious Monk live albums
1964 live albums
Columbia Records live albums